Leuconitocris similis is a species of beetle in the family Cerambycidae. It was described by Charles Joseph Gahan in 1894.

References

Leuconitocris
Beetles described in 1894